Crowdfunding is a process in which individuals or groups pool money and other resources to fund projects initiated by other people or organizations "without standard financial intermediaries." Crowdfunded projects may include creative works, products, nonprofit organizations, supporting entrepreneurship, businesses, or donations for a specific purpose (e.g., to pay for a medical procedure). Crowdfunding usually takes place via an online portal that handles the financial transactions involved and may also provide services such as media hosting, social networking, and facilitating contact with contributors. It has increased since the passage of the Jumpstart Our Business Startups (JOBS) Act.

Crowdfunding use 
Crowdfunding has a wide reach and may be utilized by businesses, nonprofit organizations, an individual, group, or an organization. Crowdfunding is used in a variety of platforms from social media to face-to-face environments. The use of crowdfunding has increased; however, success is not guaranteed.

Funds may be sought out to start a business, to support a cause, or to reach a fundraising goal.  Most crowdfunding projects are small and "seek to raise small amounts of capital, often under $1000." An individual or organization may not qualify for a traditional bank loan, and crowdfunding provides another opportunity to gain financial support from others. The use of crowdfunding has gained an increased presence since the JOBS Act and has a significant social media presence. "Approximately 25 percent of real-world relationships start online, with people of all ages migrating online to find a partner. Crowdfunding is doing for small businesses and entrepreneurs what dating sites have done for singles." Those unable to procure funding from traditional methods may be interested in pursuing crowdfunding as an option; however, the success rate may be a deterrent. E. Mollick examined Kickstarter projects from 2009 through 2012 and found many projects were not successful as only "3% raise 50% of their goal," and he stated that successful projects succeed "by relatively small margins."

Crowdfunding models 
Crowdfunding is donation-based fundraising for businesses or creative projects, typically via an online funding portal. Some but not all crowdfunding projects offer contributors rewards, which may differ based on the amount of money donated. Rewards can include copies of a creative work, products generated with the funding, special or personalized incentives (such as autographed works or promotional merchandise), or public recognition. One can classify crowdfunding as using one of the following models:

  Equity-based crowdfunding
 Reward-based crowdfunding
 Debt-based crowdfunding
 Litigation crowdfunding
 Donation-based crowdfunding

Equity-based crowdfunding
In equity crowdfunding, a crowdfunding approach is used to raise investment capital, and contributors receive equity in the resulting business. It is a joint effort made between individuals to support the causes of other people or organizations in the form of equity. Contributors may act as investors and receive shares directly, or the crowdfunding service may act as a  nominated agent. Equity crowdfunding helps "the 90 percent of businesses that were left out in the cold" by traditional funding methods, which is why it has become such a viable option for business startups.

Equity-based funding is illegal in many countries, such as India. In the United States the JOBS Act of 2012 regulated the trend. This "legislation was intended to increase access to capital for the innovative companies" in need of investment capital and allows a pool of small investors to come together. The Regulation was updated in 2021 by the SEC allowing companies to up to $5 million per year from unaccredited investors and allowing investors to invest more.

Reward-based crowdfunding
This mode, also known as "non-equity" funding, has become increasingly popular, with a 230 percent increase in 2012. Reward-based crowdfunding may fund campaigns supporting the free development of software, the promotion of motion pictures, scientific research, development of inventions, etc. Reward-based funders expect a return from the project.

Debt-based crowdfunding
This is known as "Peer to Peer", "P2P", "marketplace lending", or "crowdlending". Borrowers set up campaigns to fulfill their financial needs, and lenders contribute toward the goal for an interest. This method of online funding may prove to be "a threat to the traditional banking system in the areas of consumer and business loans, as has already been demonstrated by the rapid success of [these] online lending marketplaces."

Litigation crowdfunding
A plaintiff requests a monetary donation to fund a court case. If the claimant wins, investors may get more than their initial investment.

Donation-based crowdfunding
This type of crowdfunding "is part of a trend in which people are relying less on charities to help them fulfill their philanthropic aims". The best example might be raising funds from individuals to support personal or social causes.

Variables in online crowdfunding 
People make donations for different reasons and give to different entities. Donors may give to feel good about themselves or because they believe in a cause. Some donations are made to individuals while others are made to organizations. The same is true in online crowdfunding. However, some differences exist in their method of giving, geography, and demographics. 

Online crowdfunding donors differ from traditional fundraising donors in that donors give anonymously, do not have a connection to the recipient, and donors may seek out a cause or recipient to give to. Another important factor is that online donors are not limited by their geographic location and can give to individuals or organizations anywhere in the world. Once a fundraiser is created, individuals can share the details anywhere to attract donors and gather funds for their cause.When it comes to motives, donations are made to individuals to help them reach a goal and typically drop off once that is met; however, donations to organizations are made for a greater societal good. The demographics of online donors vary from traditional donors as "online donors tend to be younger and give larger gifts than traditional donors." This is important for online campaign organizers to note as they determine their target audience; however, those over 50 have increased their social media usage and have a presence on Facebook.

Crowdfunding as a replacement method 
More research is needed in regard to the topic of crowdfunding in general. There are benefits to online crowdfunding as it has the ability to tap into audiences that are not close in geographic proximity to an individual or organization and to increase awareness about a campaign. However, with relatively low funding success rates reported, "social networking and traditional approaches to fundraising may be complements" to help individuals and organizations raise funds but not a replacement."

See also
Peer-to-peer lending
Equity crowdfunding
Crowdsourcing

References 

Crowdfunding lists
Crowdfunding services
!